Kendall Lamont Anthony (born January 13, 1993) is an American professional basketball player for Saint-Quentin of the LNB Pro B. He played college basketball for the University of Richmond before playing professionally in Turkey, the Czech Republic, Brazil, Iceland, France and Israel.

High school
Anthony played high school basketball for Liberty Technology Magnet where he averaged 28.3 points, 3.8 assists and 2.5 steals as a senior and was a runner-up for Mr. Tennessee Basketball.

College career
Anthony played for the University of Richmond from 2011 to 2015, averaging 14.3 points per game. He was Atlantic 10 All-Conference First Team in 2015 and the Second Team in 2014. He left the school as its fourth all-time leading scorer and first in three-pointers made.

Professional career
His first career stop was with Gelisim Koleji in the TBL where he averaged 12.7 points in 15 games, earning the nickname "the Turkish Allen Iverson".

He spent the 2016–2017 season with Macae Basquete in the Novo Basquete Brasil, averaging a league leading 20.6 points and 5.9 assists in 29 games. In August 2017, he moved over to Bauru Basket of the NBB.

In October 2018, Anthony signed with Valur of the Icelandic Úrvalsdeild karla, replacing Miles Wright. On December 11, he scored 48 points for Valur in a victory against Skallagrímur. In 8 games played for Valur, he averaged 31.5 points, 8.8 assists in 8 games, while shooting 64.1% from three-point range and 94.0% from the free throw line, leading the league in each category.

On January 6, 2019, Anthony parted ways with Valur to join BCM Gravelines-Dunkerque of the French LNB Pro A after they bought up his contract. In 19 games played for Gravelines-Dunkerque, he averaged 11.5 points, 2 rebounds, 4 assists per game, while shooting 41.3 percent from three-point range.

On September 13, 2019, Anthony signed a one-year deal with Bnei Herzliya of the Israeli National League. He spent the 2020–21 season with Hapoel Galil Elyon. On November 6, 2021, Anthony signed with Saint-Quentin of the LNB Pro B.

References

External links
Icelandic statistics at kki.is
Realgm profile at realgm.com
Liga De Las Americas profile at fiba.basketball
Richmond Spiders bio

1993 births
Living people
American expatriate basketball people in Brazil
American expatriate basketball people in the Czech Republic
American expatriate basketball people in France
American expatriate basketball people in Iceland
American expatriate basketball people in Israel
American expatriate basketball people in Turkey
American men's basketball players
Associação Bauru Basketball players
Associação Macaé de Basquete players
Basketball players from Tennessee
BCM Gravelines players
Bnei Hertzeliya basketball players
Novo Basquete Brasil players
People from Jackson County, Tennessee
Point guards
Richmond Spiders men's basketball players
Sluneta Ústí nad Labem players
Úrvalsdeild karla (basketball) players
Valur men's basketball players